Tommy Deebo "Tiny" Lister Jr. (born Thomas Duane Lister Jr.; June 24, 1958 – December 10, 2020) was an American character actor and occasional professional wrestler known for his roles as the neighborhood bully Deebo in the 1995 film Friday, its 2000 sequel and as President Lindberg in The Fifth Element. He had two short professional wrestling stints, with Hulk Hogan in the World Wrestling Federation (WWF) after appearing as Zeus in the 1989 film No Holds Barred and resuming the feud as Z-Gangsta in 1996 for World Championship Wrestling (WCW). He was born with a detached and deformed retina and was blind in his right eye, which drooped, a unique look that he turned to his advantage in film. He played in both comedies and dramas, usually cast as 'the heavy/big bully'.

Early life
Lister was born on June 24, 1958, in Compton, California, to Thomas Duane Lister and Mildred (Edwards) Lister. Since his birth, he had a deformed and detached retina in his right eye, causing permanent blindness.

Lister attended Palomar Junior College before transferring to Long Beach City College for his sophomore year. While at Long Beach, he recorded a  shot put throw, which helped to earn him a scholarship to California State University, Los Angeles. Lister was the 1982 NCAA Division II National Shot Put Champion.

He was cut after two exhibition games and opted to pursue acting instead.

Acting career
Lister was mostly recognized as the antagonist known as Deebo from 1995's Friday. Deebo was the neighborhood's dog-eat-dog thug and bruiser to every character, including Ice Cube's main character Craig Jones. He reprised the role in the film's sequel, Next Friday (2000), but did not appear in the third film of the series, Friday After Next (2002). He did, however, appear in Cube's directorial debut The Players Club. He played the role of Obodo in Mario Van Peebles' Posse (1993), along with Tone Loc.

Lister had numerous guest appearances on TV series, including playing Klaang, the first Klingon to make contact with humans, in the pilot episode of Star Trek: Enterprise. He co-starred in a two-part episode of the courtroom series Matlock as Mr. Matlock's in-prison bodyguard. He appeared in season 7 episode 9 of In the Heat of the Night. He starred in the sitcom 1st & Ten as Otis.

Lister's film roles included playing in The Dark Knight, Austin Powers in Goldmember and The Human Centipede 3 (Final Sequence). Lister was featured in The Fifth Element as the Galactic President. He appeared in the Adam Sandler film Little Nicky as Nicky's older brother Cassius.

Lister was the main police officer in Chamillionaire's "Ridin'" video and reprised his role as a police officer in Chamillionaire's 2012 single "Show Love". He has appeared in the Ice Cube videos for "Friday" (from the Friday soundtrack) and "You Can Do It" (from the Next Friday soundtrack). Lister appeared via both original footage and clips from the film. He was in the videos for Young Bleed's "How You Do Dat", French Montana's "I Told 'Em" and 50 Cent's "Many Men (Wish Death)". Lister portrayed Sancho in the Sublime music video "Santeria".

In the Quentin Tarantino film Jackie Brown, he played bail agent Winston, who "finds people who don't want to be found". In 2015, Lister filmed Busy Day in Albuquerque, New Mexico. Lister had a supporting role in the 2016 Disney animated movie Zootopia as the voice of the diminutive fennec fox, Finnick. He appeared in a commercial that year for Ball Park-brand beef jerky, advertised as "tough, but tender."

Cast as an habitual 'bad guy' in films, his career prospered. He became the spokesperson for Monster Energy Drink. He was a frequent collaborator with Ice Cube. In a Twitter encomium, he recalled Lister's sense of humor: "RIP Tiny 'Deebo' Lister. America's favorite bully was a born entertainer who would pop into character at the drop of a hat terrifying people on and off camera. Followed by a big smile and laugh ... Thank you for being a good dude at heart. I miss you already."

In the 40 years of his acting career, Lister accumulated more than 200 acting credits.

Professional wrestling career

World Wrestling Federation (1989–1990)
Lister appeared in the 1989 wrestling movie No Holds Barred, which was financed by the World Wrestling Federation (WWF) and starred Hulk Hogan. Lister's role was Zeus, a brutal monster heel. No Holds Barred inspired a feud in the WWF during the latter half of 1989. Lister was billed as "Zeus: The Human Wrecking Machine", and used the same "monster heel" gimmick in his matches by no-selling his opponent's moves. He would yell, "Aw! Aw!" and pound on his chest several times during his interviews and in the ring. Zeus would eventually demand Hogan to face him in the ring.

Citing jealousy for being billed under Hogan and anger over losing to Hogan in the film, Zeus wanted to beat him in "real life". Zeus formed an alliance with fellow Hogan rival "Macho Man" Randy Savage to feud with Hogan and his friend, Brutus "The Barber" Beefcake. The two teams faced off at the 1989 SummerSlam event in a tag team match which saw Hogan and Beefcake prevail as the victors, with Hogan pinning Zeus. Following SummerSlam, Zeus formed an alliance with "The Million Dollar Man" Ted DiBiase leading into that year's Survivor Series.

At the event, the team of The Hulkamaniacs (Hulk Hogan, Jake "The Snake" Roberts, and Demolition) faced The Million Dollar Team (Ted DiBiase, Zeus, and The Powers of Pain). Zeus was eliminated from the match via disqualification after refusing to break a chokehold on Hogan and shoving the referee away. The Hulkamaniacs went on to win the match, defeating the other team. After the Survivor Series, the feud between Hulk Hogan and Brutus Beefcake versus Randy Savage and Zeus ended with a steel cage match on December 27, 1989, at the No Holds Barred pay-per-view event. Hogan and Beefcake were once again victorious in what would be Zeus's last match in the WWF. Lister's final WWF appearance was a promotional spot for the 1990 Royal Rumble.

World Wrestling Council (1990)
On July 7, 1990, Zeus fought Abdullah the Butcher in a double countout at a World Wrestling Council show in Puerto Rico.

World Championship Wrestling (1996)
Lister spent March 1996 in World Championship Wrestling (WCW) as Z-Gangsta, as part of The Alliance to End Hulkamania, culminating in failure at Uncensored. He debuted the previous week with fellow actor/wrestler Robert Swenson, who was billed as The Ultimate Solution.

Honors and awards

The athletic department of Lister's alma mater Cal State LA sponsors an annual track meet in his name.

In 2016, he was nominated for the "Best Bad Mu#&a Award" at the All Def Movie Awards. In 2014 at the Orlando Urban Film Festival, he won "Best Star Spotlight" for his performance in No Weapon Formed Against Us.

Personal life

Marriage
He was married to Felicia Forbes, formerly of Cape Town, where they married.

Legal issues
On August 31, 2012, Lister agreed to plead guilty to conspiring to commit mortgage fraud, in a scheme that led to $3.8 million in losses. He was charged with fraudulently buying homes in order to withdraw $1.1 million in home equity loans. In April 2014, he was out on bail and was confident of avoiding prison. He stated, "What's so cool about God and our government is that you can make a mistake and they will forgive you if you just a good person and doing right."

Health problems and death
By age 55, Lister had type 2 diabetes.

Lister was diagnosed with COVID-19 around August 2020 and overcame the illness. He became ill with symptoms similar to COVID-19 a second time in early December, exhibiting weakness and trouble breathing, which forced him to cancel shooting for a film. His manager Cindy McGowen, who said it was not normal for him to miss filmings, became concerned and sent her assistant to his house to give him vitamins and antibiotics.

On December 10, police who were called to check on Lister found him dead in his home in Marina del Rey, California; he was 62 years old. The coroner's office investigated his cause of death, which was originally suspected to be from complications of COVID-19. However, the final autopsy report revealed that the cause of death was hypertension and atherosclerotic cardiovascular disease.

Championships and accomplishments
Pro Wrestling Illustrated
PWI ranked him #500 of the top 500 singles wrestlers in the PWI 500 in 1991

Filmography

Film

Television

Music videos

Video games

References

External links

 Online World of Wrestling Profile
 
 
 Tommy 'Tiny' Lister Producer Profile for The 1 Second Film
 

1958 births
2020 deaths
20th-century professional wrestlers
African-American Christians
African-American male actors
African-American male professional wrestlers
American evangelicals
American male film actors
American male professional wrestlers
American male television actors
American male voice actors
Cal State Los Angeles Golden Eagles men's track and field athletes
Male actors from Los Angeles County, California
People with type 2 diabetes
Professional wrestlers from California
Sportspeople from Compton, California